The discography of Maejor, formerly known as Bei Maejor and later Maejor Ali, an American hip hop and R&B music producer and singer-songwriter, consists of one studio album, two extended plays (EPs), four mixtapes, 15 singles (including three as a featured artist) and 20 music videos.

Studio albums

EPs

Mixtapes

Singles

As lead artist

As featured artist

Guest appearances

Songwriter credits

Releases under an alias

As Area21 (with Martin Garrix)

See also
Maejor filmography 
Maejor production discography

References

External links
 
 
 
 

Discographies of American artists
 
 
Pop music discographies
Rhythm and blues discographies